Antònia Vicens i Picornell (born 1941) is a Majorcan writer in the Catalan language. She is a recipient of the Premi Sant Jordi de novel·la prize and the Premi d'Honor de les Lletres Catalanes.

Biography
Antònia Vicens i Picornell was born on 27 March 1941 in Santanyí, Balearic Islands.

Her first published book was a collection of short stories, Banc de fusta . Her novel, 39º a l'ombra, was awarded the Premi Sant Jordi de novel·la prize in 1967. In 1977, she joined the board of the Associació d'Escriptors en Llengua Catalana, serving as vice president for the Balearic Islands. She received international recognition after being honored with the Creu de Sant Jordi in 1999 and the Ramon Llull medal in 2004, which she gave back in protest at the government's Spanish language policy. Vicens writes for adults and for children. Her books have been translated into German and Spanish.

Selected works 

 1968, 39º a l'ombra
 1971, Material de fulletó
 1974, La festa de tots els morts
 1980, La Santa
 1982, Quilòmetres de tul per a un petit cadàver
 1984, Gelat de maduixa
 1987, Terra seca
 1997, L'àngel de la lluna'
 1998, Massa tímid per lligar 
 1998, Febre alta 2002, Lluny del tren 2007, Ungles perfectes''

References

1941 births
Living people
People from Santanyí
Women writers from Catalonia
Spanish novelists
Spanish children's writers
Spanish women children's writers
Novelists from Catalonia
Premi d'Honor de les Lletres Catalanes winners
Catalan-language writers